Isla Blanca or Blanca Island and their plurals may refer to:

Islands

Argentina
 Islas Blancas (es or es),  Atlantic coastal islands off Chubut Province, Argentina, List of islands of Argentina
 Isla Blanca (es), small island in Deseado Department, Santa Cruz 
 Bristol Island, in the South Sandwich Islands, claimed by Argentina as Isla Blanca
 Islote Blanco, Tierra del Fuego southern tip of Chile and Argentina, off Cape San Pío, also known as Blanca Island and Isla Blanca

Costa Rica
 Isla Cabo Blanco, Pacific coastal island off Costa Rica, also known as Blanca Island, part of Cabo Blanco Absolute Natural Reserve

México
 Isla Blanca, Quintana Roo (es), Isla Mujeres (municipality) Caribbean coastal island north of Cancun, Mexico 
 Islas Blancas, Guerrero Pacific coastal islands off the Costa Grande of Guerrero, Mexico
 Isla Blanca, Baja California, an island in Bahía Concepción, Baja California Sur, Mexico
 Isla Blanca, Sonora, Gulf of California coastal island off Guaymas, Mexico, also known as Islote Peruano

Perú
 Isla Blanca, Santa, in Áncash, guano island off the coast of Peru
 Isla Blanca, (es), Ica, Pisco Province

Philippines
 Isla Blanca, Philippines, sand island off Mambajao, Camiguin Island, the Philippines

Venezuela
 Isla Blanca, Nueva Esparta, two Caribbean coastal islands near Margarita Island off Nueva Esparta, Venezuela, Major and Minor, 
 Blanquilla Island, Venezuela, also known as Blanca Island and Isla Blanca, in the Caribbean Sea

United States
 early name for Galveston Island, see History of Galveston, Texas

Non islands
 Barra del Solís a barrio (borough or neighborhood) of Parque del Plata, Uruguay, known as Isla Blanca
 "Isla Blanca", an electronic dance music single by First State, aka "One World"
 Isla Blanca Park, a preserve and recreational park on South Padre Island, Texas

See also
 White Island (disambiguation)